Mahabad is the 7th electoral district in the West Azerbaijan Province of Iran. It has a population of 215,529 and elects 1 member of parliament.

1980
MP in 1980 from the electorate of Mahabad. (1st)
 No MP

1984
MP in 1984 from the electorate of Mahabad. (2nd)
 Ahad Anjiri

1988
MP in 1988 from the electorate of Mahabad. (3rd)
 Mohammad Hosseini

1992
MP in 1992 from the electorate of Mahabad. (4th)
 Abdolrahin Nurbakhsh

1996
MP in 1996 from the electorate of Mahabad. (5th)
 Abdolrahin Nurbakhsh

2000
MP in 2000 from the electorate of Mahabad. (6th)
 Rahman Behmanesh

2004
MP in 2004 from the electorate of Mahabad. (7th)
 Jafar Aeinparast

2008
MP in 2008 from the electorate of Mahabad. (8th)
 Jalal Mahmudzadeh

2012
MP in 2012 from the electorate of Mahabad. (9th)
 Osman Ahadi

2016

Notes

References

Electoral districts of West Azerbaijan
Mahabad County